This is a list of compositions by Reynaldo Hahn sorted by genre, date of composition, titles and scoring.

See also
 List of works for the stage by Reynaldo Hahn

References 

O'Connor, Patrick (1992), "Hahn, Reynaldo" in The New Grove Dictionary of Opera, ed. Stanley Sadie (London) 
Musicologie.org biography
Lycos.fr page on Hahn
Operone page

 
Hahn, Reynaldo